Sean Bean (born Shaun Mark Bean on 17 April 1959) is an English actor. After graduating from the Royal Academy of Dramatic Art, Bean made his professional debut in a theatre production of Romeo and Juliet in 1983. Retaining his Yorkshire accent, he first found mainstream success for his portrayal of Richard Sharpe in the ITV series Sharpe, which originally ran from 1993 to 1997. In 2020, Bean is also narrator of the BBC Radio 4 series Legacy of War, exploring the impact of the Second World War on subsequent generations through interviews and oral history.

Bean's film roles include Patriot Games (1992), GoldenEye (1995), Ronin (1998), Don't Say a Word (2001), The Lord of the Rings trilogy (2001–2003), Equilibrium (2002), National Treasure (2004), Troy (2004), Flightplan (2005), North Country (2005), The Island (2005), Silent Hill (2006), Percy Jackson & the Olympians: The Lightning Thief (2010), Black Death (2010), Jupiter Ascending (2015), and The Martian (2015).

His television roles include the BBC anthology series Accused, Broken, Game of Thrones and the ITV historical drama series Henry VIII and Legends. As a voice actor, Bean has been featured in the video games The Elder Scrolls IV: Oblivion, Sid Meier's Civilization VI, and the drama The Canterbury Tales, among others. Bean has also been the main voice over for O2 and their adverts for over 20 years having originally taken the job in 2002.

In 2022, Bean won the British Academy Television Award as Leading Actor in Time, a BBC One drama.

Early life

Shaun Mark Bean was born on 17 April 1959 in Handsworth, a suburb of Sheffield, the son of Rita and Brian K. Bean (born 1934). He has a younger sister, Lorraine. His paternal grandfather, Harold Bean Jr. (1914–2001), served in the Royal Navy in the Second World War and was a stud mill labourer who later became a pacifist. His father owned a fabrication company that employed 50 people, including Bean's mother, who worked as a secretary. Despite becoming relatively wealthy, the family never moved away from the council estate as they preferred to remain close to friends and family. As a child, Bean smashed a glass door during an argument, which left a piece of glass embedded in his leg that briefly impeded his walking, and left a large scar. This prevented him from pursuing his ambition of playing football professionally.

In 1975, Bean left Brook Comprehensive School with O levels in Art and English. After a job at a supermarket and another for the local council, he started work at his father's firm. Once a week, he attended Rotherham College of Arts and Technology to study welding. While at college, he came upon an art class, and decided to pursue his interest in art. After attending courses at two other colleges, one for half a day and the other for less than a week, he returned to Rotherham College, where he enrolled in a drama course. After some college plays and one at Rotherham Civic Theatre, he won a scholarship to the Royal Academy of Dramatic Art (RADA), starting a seven-term course in January 1981.

Career

Bean graduated from RADA in 1983, making his professional acting debut later that year as Tybalt in Romeo and Juliet at the Watermill Theatre in Newbury. His early career involved a mixture of stage and screen work. As an actor, he adopted the Irish spelling of his first name. His first national exposure came in an advert for Barbican non-alcoholic lager. In 1984, he starred in David and Jonathan by William Douglas-Home at the Redgrave Theatre in Farnham. Between 1986 and 1988, he was a member of the Royal Shakespeare Company, appearing in productions of Romeo and Juliet, The Fair Maid of the West, and A Midsummer Night's Dream. He appeared in his first film, Derek Jarman's Caravaggio (1986), opposite Tilda Swinton, playing Ranuccio Tomassoni, followed by the same director's War Requiem (1988). In 1989, he starred as the evil Dominic O'Brien in The Fifteen Streets, where he gained a dedicated following.

During the late 1980s and early 1990s, Bean became an established actor on British television. In 1990, Bean starred in Jim Sheridan's adaptation of the John B. Keane play The Field. Also in 1990, his role as the journalist Anton in Windprints examined the difficult problems of apartheid in South Africa. He appeared in the BBC productions Clarissa (1991) (with Saskia Wickham and Lynsey Baxter) and Lady Chatterley (1993) (with Joely Richardson). In 1996, he combined his love of football with his career to finally achieve his childhood dream of playing for Sheffield United, starring as Jimmy Muir in the film When Saturday Comes. Although the film was not critically acclaimed, Bean received credit for a good performance. In August 1997, Bean appeared in what became a famous Sky Sports commercial for the upcoming 1997–98 Premier League season. His football related work continued in 1998 when he narrated La Coupe de la Gloire, the official film of the 1998 FIFA World Cup held in France.

Bean's critical successes in Caravaggio and Lady Chatterley contributed to his emerging image as a sex symbol, but he became most closely associated with the character of Richard Sharpe, the maverick Napoleonic Wars rifleman in the ITV television series Sharpe. The series was based on Bernard Cornwell's novels about the Peninsular War, and the fictional experiences of a band of soldiers in the famed 95th Rifles. Starting with Sharpe's Rifles, the series followed the fortunes and misfortunes of Richard Sharpe as he rose from the ranks as a Sergeant, promoted to Lieutenant in Portugal, to Lieutenant Colonel by the time of the Battle of Waterloo.

Bean was not the first actor to be chosen to play Sharpe. As Paul McGann was injured while playing football two days into filming, the producers initially tried to work around his injury, but it proved impossible and Bean replaced him. The series ran continuously from 1993 to 1997, with three episodes produced each year. It was filmed under challenging conditions, first in Ukraine and later in Portugal. After several years of rumours, more episodes were produced: Sharpe's Challenge, which aired in April 2006, and Sharpe's Peril, which aired in autumn 2008 and was later released on DVD. Both of these were released as two cinema-length 90-minute episodes per series. With a role as enigmatic Lord Richard Fenton in the TV miniseries Scarlett, Bean made the transition to Hollywood feature films. His first notable Hollywood appearance was that of an Irish republican terrorist in the 1992 film adaptation of Patriot Games. While filming his death scene, Harrison Ford hit him with a boat hook, giving him a permanent scar. Bean's rough-cut looks made him a patent choice for a villain, and his role in Patriot Games was the first of several villains that he would portray, all of whom die in gruesome ways.

In the 1995 film GoldenEye, Bean portrayed James Bond's nemesis Alec Trevelyan (MI6's 006). He played the weak-stomached Spence in Ronin (1998), a wife-beating ex-con in Essex Boys (2000), and a malevolent kidnapper/jewel thief in Don't Say a Word (2001). He was also widely recognised as villainous treasure hunter Ian Howe in National Treasure, and played a villainous scientist in The Island (2005). In the independent film Far North, he plays a Russian mercenary who gets lost in the tundra and is rescued by an Inuit woman and her daughter, whom he later pits against one another.

Bean's most prominent role was as Boromir in Peter Jackson's The Lord of the Rings trilogy. His major screen time occurs in the first instalment, The Lord of the Rings: The Fellowship of the Ring. He appears briefly in flashbacks in The Lord of the Rings: The Two Towers and The Lord of the Rings: The Return of the King, as well as in a scene from the extended edition of The Two Towers. Before casting finished, rumours circulated that Jackson had considered Bean for the role of Aragorn, but neither Bean nor Jackson confirmed this in subsequent interviews. Bean's fear of flying in helicopters caused him difficulties in mountainous New Zealand, where the trilogy was filmed. After a particularly rough ride, he vowed not to fly to a location again; in one instance, he chose to take a ski lift into the mountains while wearing his full costume (complete with shield, armour, and sword) and then hike the final few miles.

Other roles gave more scope for his acting abilities. In 1999's Extremely Dangerous, his character walked a fine line between villain and hero. He became a repentant, poetry-reading Grammaton cleric who succumbs to his emotions in 2002's Equilibrium, a quirky alien cowboy in 2003's The Big Empty, and a sympathetic and cunning Odysseus in the 2004 film Troy. He appeared with other Hollywood stars in Moby's music video "We Are All Made of Stars" in February 2002. In the same year, he returned to the stage in London performing in Macbeth. Due to popular demand, the production ran until March 2003.

Bean has done voice-over work, mostly in the British advertising industry. He has featured in television adverts for O2, Morrisons and Barnardos as well as for Acuvue and the Sci-Fi Channel in the United States. He also does the voice over for the National Blood Service's television and radio campaign. Bean has also filmed a TV ad for Yorkshire Tea, a United Kingdom brand of tea. For the role playing video game, The Elder Scrolls IV: Oblivion, he voiced Martin Septim. Bean's distinctive voice has also been used in the intro and outro segments of the BBC Formula 1 racing coverage for the 2011 and 2012 seasons.

Bean completed a one-hour pilot, Faceless, for US television. He has also appeared in Outlaw, an independent British production, and a remake of 1986 horror film, The Hitcher (released in January 2007); here he used an American accent again. In 2009, he appeared in the Red Riding trilogy as the malevolent John Dawson. He also appeared in Percy Jackson & the Olympians: The Lightning Thief (2010), playing the role of Zeus, the king of Mount Olympus and god of the sky, thunder, and lightning. Also that year, Bean starred in Cash, playing the lead role of Pyke Kubic, a dangerous man determined to recover his wealth in a bad economy. Cash explored the role money plays in today's hard economic times. Bean also played the villain's twin brother, Reese. Bean starred in the first season of Game of Thrones, HBO's adaptation of the A Song of Ice and Fire novels by George R. R. Martin, playing the part of Lord Eddard "Ned" Stark. Bean and Peter Dinklage were the two actors whose inclusion show runners David Benioff and D. B. Weiss considered necessary for the show to become a success, and for whose roles no other actors were considered. His portrayal won him critical praise; as The A.V. Club reviewer put it, he "portrayed Ned as a man who knew he lived in the muck but hoped for better and assumed everyone else would come along for the ride." HBO's promotional efforts focused on Bean as the show's leading man and best-known actor.

In August 2012, Bean appeared as cross-dressing teacher Simon in the opening episode of the second season of UK television series Accused, a role which would earn him a Royal Television Society best actor award. He starred in Soldiers of Fortune and the 2012 film Cleanskin, in which he plays a secret service agent faced with the task of pursuing and eliminating a suicide bomber and his terrorist cell. In 2012 he also appeared in Tarsem Singh's Snow White film, Mirror Mirror, which was released in the U.S. in March. He also reprised his role as Christopher Da Silva in the Silent Hill film sequel Silent Hill: Revelation, and co-starred in the ABC drama series Missing, which premiered in early 2012.

Bean starred in the espionage television series Legends as Martin Odum, an FBI agent who takes on various fabricated identities to go undercover. The show was cancelled after its second season. An intensive viral marketing campaign was centred on the hashtag #DontKillSeanBean, focusing on the various deaths of his past characters and promising his character in Legends would not suffer the same fate. The campaign culminated with a Funny or Die exclusive video featuring Bean filming a scene for the show where he's become so accustomed to dying on screen that he expects his character to die a bizarrely gruesome death despite the simplicity of the scene.

From 2015 to 2017, Bean starred in the ITV Encore drama series The Frankenstein Chronicles. In that time, he also starred in multiple notable films including Jupiter Ascending, Pixels, and The Martian. In 2017, Bean starred in the BBC series Broken as the troubled priest Father Michael Kerrigan, which earned him a BAFTA award for Best Actor. In 2019, Bean played a damaged veteran in the TV drama World on Fire, basing his interpretation on his late paternal grandfather.

On 31 May 2020, Bean appeared on Josh Gad's YouTube series Reunited Apart which reunites the cast of popular movies through video-conferencing, and promotes donations to non-profit charities. The episode saw Bean reunited with fellow Lord of the Rings castmates Sean Astin, Orlando Bloom, Billy Boyd, Ian McKellen, Dominic Monaghan, Viggo Mortensen, Miranda Otto, John Rhys-Davies, Andy Serkis, Liv Tyler, Karl Urban, and Elijah Wood, plus composer Howard Shore, writer Philippa Boyens and director Peter Jackson.

In 2021, the actor was reunited with Jimmy McGovern (author of Broken and Accused) and Stephen Graham (his co-star in Tracie's Story) for the 3-part BBC prison drama Time.

In September 2021, it was announced that Stefan Golaszewski's new drama, Marriage would air in 2022 and would star Bean alongside Nicola Walker. The series opened to mixed reviews from both critics and viewers.

Public image
Bean is often described as "down to earth" and has retained his Yorkshire accent. He says that he does not mind being considered as a "bit of rough" by women. He has developed a reputation as a loner, a label that he considers unfair. He has described himself instead as quiet, and interviewers confirm that he is a "man of few words", with one interviewer calling him "surprisingly shy". He admits that he can be a workaholic; he reads books or listens to music in his spare time, and is a skilled pianist. He is also a keen gardener, welder, and sketcher. Popular in his home county, a 2018 poll for Yorkshire Day saw Bean ranked the second greatest Yorkshireman ever behind Monty Python comedian, and fellow Sheffielder, Michael Palin.

A reputation for frequently portraying characters who are violently killed has earned Bean the status of an Internet meme.

Acting style
Despite being professionally trained, Bean adopted an instinctive style of acting that some say makes him especially well-suited to portraying his characters' depths. He has said that the most difficult part is at the start of filming when trying to understand the character. After achieving this, he can snap in and out of character instantly. This ability to go from the quiet man on set to the warrior Boromir "amazed" Sean Astin during filming of The Fellowship of the Ring. Other fans include directors Mike Figgis and Wolfgang Petersen, who described working with Bean as a "beautiful thing".

Deaths of characters
Bean's characters tend to die on screen, a phenomenon that has gained notoriety on the internet and in The Lord of The Rings, Game of Thrones and James Bond fandoms. As a result, Bean said in 2019 he would reject scripts which called for his character's demise.

Personal life
Bean has been married five times and divorced four times. He married his secondary school sweetheart Debra James on 11 April 1981, and they were divorced in 1988. He met actress Melanie Hill at RADA, and they were married on 27 February 1990. Their first daughter was born in October 1987, and their second was born in September 1991. Their marriage ended in divorce in August 1997. During the filming of Sharpe, Bean met actress Abigail Cruttenden, and they were married on 22 November 1997. Their daughter was born in November 1998. They were divorced in July 2000. In addition to his three children, Bean has four grandchildren.

Bean began dating actress Georgina Sutcliffe in 2006. After cancelling their planned January 2008 wedding on the eve of the ceremony for "personal reasons", he married Sutcliffe at the Marylebone Town Hall in London on 19 February 2008. During allegations that Bean physically abused Sutcliffe in 2009, domestic disturbances resulted in the police being called to their home in Belsize Park on three occasions. Bean and Sutcliffe's separation was announced on 6 August 2010, and a decree nisi was granted on 21 December 2010. He married Ashley Moore on 30 June 2017.

Bean has been a fan of Sheffield United (the "Blades") since he was eight years old, and has a tattoo on his left shoulder that reads "100% Blade". He opened their Hall of Fame in 2001 and, after making a six-figure contribution to the club's finances, was on their board of directors between 2002 and 2007 to help raise the profile of the club. He stepped down in 2007 to "go back to being an ordinary supporter" where he feels at home. During his time there, he had a dispute with Neil Warnock, former manager of Sheffield United, after Warnock claimed that Bean stormed into his office and shouted at him in front of his wife and daughter when the club had just been relegated from the Premier League. Bean denies it, calling Warnock "bitter" and "hypocritical". He wrote the foreword and helped to promote a book of anecdotes called Sheffield United: The Biography. He also follows Yorkshire County Cricket Club.

Bean has a tattoo of the number nine on his shoulder, written using Tengwar, in reference to his involvement in the Lord of the Rings films and the fact that his character was one of the original nine companions of the Fellowship of the Ring. Seven of the other actors of "The Fellowship" (Elijah Wood, Sean Astin, Orlando Bloom, Billy Boyd, Ian McKellen, Dominic Monaghan, and Viggo Mortensen) have the same tattoo. John Rhys-Davies, whose character was also one of the original nine companions, arranged for his stunt double to get the tattoo instead.

Aligned with the British Left, in 2015 Bean expressed support for Jeremy Corbyn and "old Labour", the era before former Prime Minister Tony Blair rebranded the Labour Party as New Labour, and he spoke of his admiration for Tony Benn.

Bean is Christian and a keen gardener in his spare time.

Filmography

Film

Television

Video games

Music videos

Awards and honours
In his home city of Sheffield, he has received several honours and acclaims, including an honorary doctorate from Sheffield Hallam University in 1997 and a Doctor of Letters in English Literature from the University of Sheffield in July 2007. He was selected as one of the inaugural members of Sheffield Legends (the Sheffield equivalent of the Hollywood Walk of Fame) and a plaque in his honour has been placed in front of Sheffield Town Hall. Bean commented: "I did get a doctorate from Sheffield Hallam University about 11 or 12 years ago so now I'm a double doctor. But this was wonderful, especially from my home city."

References

Further reading
 Trowbridge, Simon: The Company: A Biographical Dictionary of the Royal Shakespeare Company, Oxford: Editions Albert Creed (2010)

External links

 
 The Company: A Biographical Dictionary of the RSC: Online database
 

1959 births
20th-century English male actors
21st-century English male actors
Alumni of RADA
Best Actor BAFTA Award (television) winners
English male film actors
English male Shakespearean actors
English male stage actors
English male television actors
English male voice actors
International Emmy Award for Best Actor winners
Labour Party (UK) people
Living people
Male actors from Sheffield
Male actors from Yorkshire
Outstanding Performance by a Cast in a Motion Picture Screen Actors Guild Award winners
Royal Shakespeare Company members
Sheffield United F.C. directors and chairmen
English Christians